Rud Posht (also Romanized as Rūd Posht; also known as Rūd Posht-e Bālā, Rūd Posht-e Pā’īn, and Rud-Pusht) is a village in Chahar Farizeh Rural District, in the Central District of Bandar-e Anzali County, Gilan Province, Iran. At the 2006 census, its population was 396, in 115 families.

References 

Populated places in Bandar-e Anzali County